Rabi ibn Sabih (d. 160 AH) was an early Muslim and a pioneer in recording the hadith among the Sunni Muslims in Basra

In the book titled 'The Muwatta of imam Muhammed', Introduction, Topic one:How the writing of Ahadith Spread, it is stated:

References

Tabi‘un
770s deaths
Year of birth unknown
8th-century Arabs